Forever Green is a television programme originally broadcast on ITV in the United Kingdom from 26 February 1989 to 24 May 1992. It was made for London Weekend Television by Picture Partnership Productions, now named Carnival Films.

Cast
Pauline Collins - Harriet Boult
John Alderton - Jack Boult
Daisy Bates - Freddy Boult
Nimer Rashed - Tom Boult
Paola Dionisotti - Lady Patricia Broughall
Wendy van der Plank - Hilly
Alan Rowe - Geoff Bate
Ian Lindsay - Ted Hubbard

Plot
Jack, a former racing driver, and Harriet Boult, a nurse, live in a London flat with their two children, Frederica (Freddy) and Tom. Freddy suffers from asthma, which Harriet believes could be due to the city pollution, and after a serious attack begins to think leaving the city could be the best treatment available. Soon after, a letter arrives advising Harriet of an inheritance from one of her old patients, a run-down house in the country. It only takes one visit to persuade them to move.

The 18 episodes contain plots dealing with their adapting to life in the country and touches on environmental themes, alternative healing and alternative lifestyle choices.

Episodes

Filming locations
The Boult family's country home, Meadows Green Farm, is sometimes said to have been in the Cotswolds, though place names mentioned in the series point to it being further south in Somerset. For example, the fictional address of Geoff Bate's Handcross Garage is Handcross, Somerset, and Shepton is mentioned frequently, presumably a reference to Shepton Mallet. The exact location of the house is at Tunley, two miles southeast of Bisley, near Sapperton, Gloucestershire.

A scene in the first episode of series two was filmed at Furze Platt Senior School in Berkshire.

Lady Patricia's house is Nether Winchendon House in Nether Winchendon, Buckinghamshire.

Also, Wincanton, in Somerset, is mentioned in the third episode. The horse rustlers were caught the other side of Wincanton, more evidence to suggest it was filmed in Somerset.

Other information
Originally filmed as three series, broadcast of the second series was delayed by coverage of the Gulf War and series 2 and 3 were shown as a continuous twelve-episode second series in 1992.

Home video and DVD
Series 1 was originally released by Granada Ventures Ltd on VHS and DVD.

All episodes have since been released on DVD by Network. The first series was re-released on a two-disc set in June 2009. The remaining twelve episodes were released as a three-disc Series 2 DVD in April 2010.  Later in 2010, a five-disc set of all eighteen episodes was released

The series was originally conceived and written by Terence Brady and Charlotte Bingham for LWTV and Picture Partnerships. Brady and Bingham then wrote the entire first series, but due to a serious dispute with the producers they then withdrew from the subsequent series and requested their names be removed from the credits. They did, however, retain format and copyright in the series and characters.

See also
Down to Earth (BBC series with a very similar theme)

References

External links
 

1989 British television series debuts
1992 British television series endings
1980s British drama television series
1990s British drama television series
London Weekend Television shows
ITV television dramas
Television series by ITV Studios
English-language television shows
Television shows set in England